Chrysoporthe is a genus of fungi in the family Cryphonectriaceae.

External links

Sordariomycetes genera
Diaporthales